This is a list of the seasons played by IFK Göteborg from 1904 when the club was founded to the most recent season. IFK Göteborg has spent most of its seasons in the highest Swedish league, Allsvenskan, and has also competed in the Swedish cup competition Svenska Cupen, the early championship deciding cup Svenska Mästerskapet and all major European competitions as well as other leagues and tournaments. This list includes all achievements in those tournaments and competitions as well as the top scorer for each season.

Key

List of seasons

Notes

References 
All sources in  unless otherwise noted.
Books

 

Online

Seasons
 
Ifk Goteborg